The 1959 UK & Ireland Greyhound Racing Year was the 33rd year of greyhound racing in the United Kingdom and Ireland.

Roll of honour

Summary
Mile Bush Pride was voted Greyhound of the Year after becoming only the second greyhound, after Trev's Perfection to win the Triple Crown which consisted of the English Greyhound Derby, Scottish Greyhound Derby and Welsh Greyhound Derby. Trained by Jack Harvey for owner Noel Purvis, a shipping magnate, the brindle greyhound also won the Pall Mall, Select Stakes and Cesarewitch in 1959.

Competitions
Irish Greyhound Derby champion Colonel Perry moved kennels from John Bassett to Tom Baldwin and finished a disappointing fourth in the final of the Gold Collar behind Dunstown Warrior. After his English Greyhound Derby success, Mile Bush Pride ran out an eleven and a quarter winner of the Welsh Derby, in 28.80 seconds, eclipsing the previous track record by over five lengths. Mile Bush Pride then achieved the Triple Crown by winning the Scottish Derby in 29.41, beating the defending champion Just Fame by eight lengths.

During 1959 Pigalle Wonder won the Anglo-Irish International, the Wood Lane Stakes and successfully defended his Edinburgh Cup title.

News
Charlie Birch became the new Racing Manager at White City and the Oaks moved to sister track Harringay Stadium. At the pre-Derby final luncheon at the Dorchester Hotel, Mrs Frances Chandler called for two changes to the sport. First the standardisation of starting traps and secondly the setting up of a greyhound national stud. The National Greyhound Racing Society considered changing the tote deductions at all National Greyhound Racing Club affiliated tracks. The current deduction stands at 16%, of which 10% goes to the government.

It was announced at the London veterinary conference that a vaccine had been found to counteract canine hepatitis. Now both distemper and hepatitis can be controlled.

Ireland
A new track in Ireland opened in the form of Lifford, which was a former schooling track. The venue just south of the Northern Irish border in County Donegal was opened by James Magee. His sons Cathal and Sheamus would help run the track for many years. A track bookmakers strike over the cost of admissions to their staff resulted in racing being halted at many Irish venues.

One of the most prominent sires of all time, The Grand Champion died aged 9½. He had sired many champions including Mile Bush Pride and Palms Printer.

Principal UK races

+Track record

References 

Greyhound racing in the United Kingdom
Greyhound racing in the Republic of Ireland
UK and Ireland Greyhound Racing Year
UK and Ireland Greyhound Racing Year
UK and Ireland Greyhound Racing Year
UK and Ireland Greyhound Racing Year